Platypalpus candicans is a species of fly in the family Hybotidae. It is found in the  Palearctic.

References

External links
Images representing Platypalpus candicans  at BOLD

Hybotidae
Insects described in 1815
Asilomorph flies of Europe